

Events

Births
Khwaju Kermani (died 1352), Persian Sufi

Deaths

13th-century poetry
Poetry